Forest Knolls is a neighbourhood in the Township of Langley in the Fraser Valley of British Columbia, Canada.  It is located immediately south of Fort Langley. It is an affluent community of homes situated on small acreages.

Location
Forest Knolls is located in the north-central portion of the Township of Langley. The Salmon River lies adjacent, with farms surrounding the remaining sides.

History
The neighbourhood was formerly forest and farmland before being urbanized in the 1960s and 1970s.  It was originally marketed as the Stanley Park of the Fraser Valley in reference to the large number of evergreen trees located throughout the area. The historical Telegraph Trail traversed the area the neighbourhood is now located in.

The area was home to eccentric British Columbian and former consul general of Monaco in Canada, Fritz Ziegler.  Mr. Ziegler had constructed a replica 16th Century castle in which he resided.  Although the castle was demolished in the late 2000s, an adjacent nature path - the Ziegler Trail - is named after Mr. Ziegler.

Transportation
The neighbourhood is bounded by Glover Road and 232nd Street.  British Columbia Highway 1 and British Columbia Highway 10 are located to the southeast.

The Canadian Pacific Railway runs just south of the community on the former BC Electric Railway track.

References

Neighbourhoods in Langley, British Columbia
Langley, British Columbia (district municipality)